Naoko Kumagai (born August 8, 1971 in Yamanashi) is a Japanese female kickboxer and 3-time World  Champion in 3 different weight classes. She also had two amateur boxing matches with Russian Elena Karpachova, and one pro boxing match.

Kumagai is known for her knockout punch and high KO percentage. Her kickboxing record is 36 fights, with 31 wins (27 via KO), 4 losses and 2 draws.

Notable fights
Pro debut loss to WKA world Champion Ella Yee of the United Kingdom; Kumagai defeated German Kickboxing Champion, Regina Halmich, by first-round KO; A five-round decision victory over ISKA World Kickboxing Champion, Kim "Fireball" Messer of the USA;

A First round KO victory over Japan's Natsumi Nakazawa; two fights with Australian star, Amanda Buchanan: The first fight with Buchanan was a five-round decision loss to Buchanan for the WKA World Title and the rematch with Buchanan was a 4th-round KO victory for Kumagai over Buchanan as Kumagai regained her WKA world title from Buchanan.

Kumagai VS WKA World Champion, Lisa Howarth, 2 fights: The First fight with Lisa Howarth in Manchester, England was ruled a no contest, by the WKA.

The 2nd fight with Lisa Howarth in Tokyo was a first-round KO Kumagai victory for the WKA World flyweight Title;

Kumagai vs Kyoko Miyazake, "aka Kamikaze" was a fourth rd TKO victory world title defense.

Kickboxing Decision win over MMA star, Yoko Takahashi.

Draw vs Australian Star, Holly Ferneley, in a five-round Muay Thai fight.

Draw vs shootboxing champion, Terumi Fujiyama, in a shoot boxing fight. One exhibition fight against World Champion, Sachiyo Shibata(no decision was rendered in this "exhibition fight")

Titles

 Double-K World Women's Lightweight Champion
 WKA World Flyweight and Bantamweight Title
 UKF World Super Bantamweight Title

Media career

She appeared in Jackass: The Movie segment "Ass Kicked By Girl" beating up Ryan Dunn in a kickboxing session.

References

External links
 This site is temporarily unavailable Fightprofile at womenkickboxing.com
 

1971 births
Living people
Japanese female kickboxers
Sportspeople from Yamanashi Prefecture
Japanese women boxers
Lightweight kickboxers
Bantamweight kickboxers